Chacabuco Province is one of six provinces of the Santiago Metropolitan Region in central Chile. It is located north of the Province of Santiago, which is  entirely urbanized and part of the Santiago conurbation.

Administration
As a province, Chacabuco is a second-level administrative division of Chile, governed by a provincial delegate who is appointed by the president. Current delegate is Giordano Delpin, who was appointed by Gabriel Boric.

Communes
The province is composed of three communes (Spanish: comunas), each governed by a municipality consisting of an alcalde and municipal council:
 Colina, the capital city: pop. 77,815
 Lampa: pop. 40,228
 Til-Til: pop. 14,755

Geography and demography
According to the 2002 census, Chacabuco was the least populous province in the region with a total population of 132,798. At that time, there were 99,201 people living in urban areas, 33,597 living in rural areas, 69,184 men, and 63,614 women.

References

External links
 

Provinces of Chile
Provinces of Santiago Metropolitan Region